Gulai is a class of spicy and rich stew commonly found in Indonesia, Malaysia and Singapore. The main ingredients of this dish are usually poultry, goat meat, beef, mutton, various kinds of offal, fish and seafood, as well as vegetables such as cassava leaves, unripe jackfruit and banana stem.

Gulai is often described as Indonesian curry, although it is also considered a local dish in Malaysia and Singapore. Gulai is a common name to refer to curry dishes in the country, although Indonesian, Malaysian, and Singaporean cuisine also recognise kari (curry).

Ingredients 

The gulai sauces commonly have a thick consistency with a yellowish colour because of the addition of ground turmeric. Gulai sauce ingredients consist of rich spices such as turmeric, coriander, black pepper, galangal, ginger, chilli pepper, shallot, garlic, fennel, lemongrass, cinnamon and caraway, ground into paste and cooked in coconut milk with the main ingredients. In Malaysia, kerisik is also added to thicken the gravy.

Gulai recipes and ingredients are slightly different across the archipelago. For example the colour of gulai in Java is mostly light yellow, while in Sumatra, it has a more reddish tone. In Palembang, the gulai composes of ingredients such as garlic, shallot, turmeric, turmeric leaf, and pineapple. In Minangkabau lands of West Sumatra, the ruku-ruku leaf (Ocimum tenuiflorum) is a must-use ingredient, while in its Javanese counterpart, the corriander is favoured. Another difference is that tamarind is often added in Javanese gulai called gule, giving it a slightly sourer taste than other versions of gulai.

History 

Gulai originated on the island of Sumatra, Indonesia and is thought to be a local adaptation of Indian curry, having developed and derived from Indian influence on Southeast Asia. The dish is widely served in the Malay Archipelago, especially in Sumatra, the Malay Peninsula, Java and Borneo. The thick and yellowish gulai sauce is one of the most common sauces found in Minangkabau cuisine, used to give a rich and spicy taste to meats, fish, and vegetables. Gulai is often described as succulent and spicy, yet subtly combining flavours of different spices into one suave and smooth taste which makes it difficult to figure out the individual spices used.

The ingredients are simmered and slowly cooked in coconut milk, a mixture of spices and chili pepper. The thick golden, yellowish, succulent and spicy gulai sauce has become a hallmark that can be seen on window displays of restaurant establishments in Padang, Indonesia. In Padang, smart cooking means being capable of preparing gulai. Rendang (beef simmered in coconut milk and spices), asam padeh (sour and spicy stew) and kalio (watery and light-coloured gravy) are often considered as variations of Padang gulai.

In Malaysia, asam pedas, a popular Malay sour fish soup is sometimes called gulai tumis. In the states of Perak and Pahang, gulai tempoyak, a local specialty is commonly served as a daily meal and a meal for festive celebrations such as Hari Raya and wedding ceremonies. Negeri Sembilan is well known nationwide for its spicy dishes. Masak lemak cili api, a type of gulai made with coconut milk spiced with turmeric and bird's eye chili, is described as the hallmark of Negeri Sembilanese cuisine. In some restaurants, roti canai (which is usually served with curry) might also be served with gulai.

The gulai sauce found in Minangkabau, Acehnese, and Malay cuisine usually has a thicker consistency than the gulai sauce found in Java which is thinner, served in soup-like dishes containing pieces of mutton, beef or offal. Gulai is usually served with steamed rice.

Variations 
Gulai recipes can be found in various cooking traditions across the Indonesian Archipelago; such as Minangkabau, Malay, Acehnese and Javanese cuisine. However, gulai recipes show exceptional diversity in West Sumatra. Some variations of gulai include:

Poultry
 Gulai ayam (chicken gulai)
 Gulai itik (duck gulai)
 Gulai telur (hard boiled chicken egg gulai)
 Gulai telur itik (duck egg gulai), a specialty of Negeri Sembilan

Meat
 Gulai kambing (mutton gulai)
 Gulai sapi (beef gulai)

Insect
 Gulai belalang padi (grasshopper gulai), a specialty of Negeri Sembilan.

Offal
 Gulai hati (cattle liver gulai)
 Gulai limpa (cattle spleen gulai)
 Gulai gajeboh (cattle hump fat gulai)
 Gulai iso or gulai usus (cattle intestine gulai)
 Gulai babat (tripe gulai)
 Gulai tembusu or tambunsu (intestine gulai filled with egg) 
 Gulai tunjang or kikil (cattle foot tendon, skin and cartilage)
 Gulai otak (cattle brain gulai)
 Gulai sumsum (cattle marrow gulai)
 Gulai hati ampela (chicken gizzard, liver, and intestine gulai)

Fish and sea food
 Gulai ikan mas (carp gulai)
 Gulai ikan patin (pangasius gulai) 
 Gulai ikan kakap (red snapper gulai)
 Gulai kepala ikan kakap (red snapper's head gulai)
 Gulai telur ikan (roe gulai)
 Gulai ketam, gulai kepiting or gulai rajungan (crab)
 Gulai cumi or gulai sotong (cuttle fish/squid)
 Gulai udang (shrimp)
 Gulai tulang ikan
 Gulai tumis

Vegetable
 Gulai batang pisang (Banana stem gulai), a specialty of Kedah
 Gulai cubadak or gulai nangka muda (unripe jackfruit gulai)
 Gulai daun pakis (fern leaf gulai)
 Gulai daun singkong (cassava leaf gulai)
 Gulai kacang panjang (common beans gulai)
 Gulai jariang or gulai jengkol (Archidendron pauciflorum gulai)
 Gulai pisang muda (Young banana gulai), a specialty of Negeri Sembilan 
 Gulai rebung (bamboo shoot gulai)
 Gulai sukun (breadfruit gulai)
 Gulai tahu (tofu gulai)
 Gulai tempe (tempeh gulai)

Gallery

See also

 Cuisine of Indonesia
 Cuisine of Malaysia
 Padang cuisine
 Asam pedas
 Thai curry
 Goulash
 Jjigae

References

External links 
 Red snapper's head gulai recipe  
 Goat meat gulai recipe  

Padang cuisine
Indonesian curries
Malaysian cuisine
Singaporean cuisine
Bruneian cuisine
Thai curries